Lampadena is a genus of lanternfishes.

Species
There are currently nine recognized species in this genus:
 Lampadena anomala A. E. Parr, 1928
 Lampadena chavesi Collett, 1905 (Chaves' lanternfish)
 Lampadena dea Fraser-Brunner, 1949
 Lampadena luminosa (Garman, 1899) (Luminous lanternfish)
 Lampadena notialis B. G. Nafpaktitis & Paxton, 1968 (Notal lanternfish)
 Lampadena pontifex G. Krefft, 1970
 Lampadena speculigera Goode & T. H. Bean, 1896 (Mirror lanternfish)
 Lampadena urophaos Paxton, 1963
 Lampadena urophaos atlantica Maul, 1969
 Lampadena urophaos urophaos Paxton, 1963 (Sunbeam lampfish)
 Lampadena yaquinae (Coleman & B. G. Nafpaktitis, 1972)

References

Myctophidae
Taxa named by George Brown Goode
Taxa named by Tarleton Hoffman Bean
Marine fish genera